The 2022 African Judo Championships was the 43rd edition of the African Judo Championships and were held at the Convention Centre Mohammed Ben Ahmed in Oran, Algeria from 26 to 29 May 2022, with the mixed team event taking place on the championships' last day.

Event videos 

The event airs on the African Judo Union's YouTube channel.

Medal summary

Men's events

Women's events

Mixed team event 

Source:

Medal table

Kata 

.

References

External links 

 

2022
African Championships
African Judo Championships
African Judo Championships
International sports competitions hosted by Algeria
Judo, African Championships
Judo